MobilePay is a mobile payment application developed by Danske Bank. The service allows payments by means of a smartphone application and was published on May 7, 2013, after Danske Bank discontinued its cooperation with other Danish banks on a common system. It is mainly used in Denmark, but also in Finland. MobilePay was also available in Norway, but shut down in January 2018 due to competition from Vipps. MobilePay is a member of the European Mobile Payment Systems Association. MobilePay is present in Denmark, Finland and Greenland. MobilePay is not available in Faroe Islands.

Function 
MobilePay is an application for phones with operating systems iOS and Android. MobilePay is a digital wallet covering all payment needs. Payments can be made to friends, smaller physical shops, supermarkets and larger chains, recurring payments, ecommerce and mcommerce and donations. By downloading this application, users are required to connect a credit card and account information to their mobile number. Money transfers are performed by entering a mobile phone number which is registered in the system. The funds are then transferred to this account, while the amount is deducted from the sender's credit card. There are no fees for private MobilePay accounts.

Security 
The application is protected by a user-selected four-digit PIN code or a fingerprint. The login id is either the CPR-number (national id number), or the more secure NemID.

Requirements in Denmark 
Users must be resident in Denmark, have an Android or iPhone smartphone with a Danish phone number, a Danish CPR-number, a Danish bank account with a card, and be at least 13 years old. Private people can only have one MobilePay account. Companies and people doing business can have a business account, which has fees (around DKK 0.30-0.80 per transaction).
In Finland different kind of requirements might apply.

History 
Payment via mobile phones first became popular in Denmark, when DSB and the other traffic operators in the Copenhagen metropolitan area launched ticketing via SMS in January 2009, which worked as an extension of a similar system in Funen.

In 2012, the Danish banks started a joint project for a new system. Danske Bank chose to discontinue the cooperation at the end of 2012, quoting among other reasons that the joint system would not be usable outside of Denmark.

On May 7, 2013, Danske Bank launched MobilePay, which by the end of 2013 had been installed 877.000 times. The cooperation between the other banks was named Swipp (now defunct), and was launched on June 13, 2013.

Originally Danske Bank intended to offer MobilePay free of charge until the end of 2013, but then decided to let the system remain free of charge for private users even after this date.

MobilePay is also offered in Finland.

In August 2015 MobilePay was marketed in Norway. It has been downloaded over 300.000 times but the main competitor in Norway Vipps is much more used. On January 11, 2018 MobilePay discontinued all services in Norway including online payment, in app payment, in store payment and payment to other users. This was largely due to most of Norway's other banks all backing Vipps.

In June 2021 it was announced that MobilePay, the Norwegian service Vipps and the Finnish service Pivo will join into one company and one technology, however keeping brand names.

See also
 Swish – Mobile payment service in Sweden
 NemID – Danish electronic identification system

References 

Danske Bank
Mobile payments